André Dhominique Queiroz Santiago da Silva (born 7 October 2003), known as André Dhominique or just André, is a Brazilian professional footballer who plays as a right back for Bahia.

Career statistics

Honours

International
Brazil U20
South American U-20 Championship: 2023

References

2003 births
Living people
Sportspeople from Bahia
Brazilian footballers
Brazil youth international footballers
Association football defenders
Campeonato Brasileiro Série B players
Esporte Clube Bahia players